The 2009 Louisville Cardinals football team represented the University of Louisville in the 2009 NCAA Division I FBS football season. The Cardinals were coached by Steve Kragthorpe, who was in his third season at Louisville. The Cardinals played their home games at Papa John's Cardinal Stadium. The Cardinals finished the season with a record 4–8 and 1–6 in Big East play. Kragthorpe was fired at the end of the season.

Schedule

Roster

References

Louisville
Louisville Cardinals football seasons
Louisville Cardinals football